Sun FM (98.9 FM or 98.7 FM) is an English language radio station in Sri Lanka.  The station is owned by Asia Broadcasting Corporation.  It has broadcast since 1 July 1998.  Its current format is pop music.

Sun FM sponsors an annual music festival known as Sunfest.

References

External links

English-language radio stations in Sri Lanka